Mimodesisa is a genus of longhorn beetles of the subfamily Lamiinae, containing the following species:

 Mimodesisa affinis Breuning, 1942
 Mimodesisa albofasciculata Breuning, 1969
 Mimodesisa bimaculata Breuning & de Jong, 1941

References

Pteropliini